"Stars on Stevie" a.k.a. "Stars Medley" a.k.a. "Stars on 45 III: A Tribute to Stevie Wonder" is a song issued in 1982 by the Dutch studio group Stars on 45, in the UK credited to 'Starsound', in the US 'Stars On'. It was the first single from the band's third full-length release The Superstars (UK title: Stars Medley, US title: Stars on Longplay III) and was Stars on 45's fourth single release in both Europe and North America.

The "Stars on Stevie" medley featured a selection of songs made famous by Stevie Wonder, ranging from his first US hit "Fingertips" released in 1963 via classics like "Isn't She Lovely", "You Are the Sunshine of My Life", "Sir Duke" and "Yester-Me, Yester-You, Yesterday" to his then most recent American charttopper "Master Blaster (Jammin)". The soundalike vocals were provided by established Dutch singer Tony Sherman (born Renold Shearman in Curaçao), who had started his career in music as early as in 1970 with Dutch-Caribbean funk band Reality and releasing a series of albums with them before going solo in the late 70s.

"Stars on Stevie" became the highest charting Stars on 45 single in the US since their first charttopping Beatles medley, peaking at #28 on Billboard'''s Hot 100. In the UK it became the group's fourth consecutive Top 20 hit, peaking at #14 in February 1982, slightly higher in Ireland at #10 and it was indeed a #20 hit in most parts of Europe. In the Netherlands "Stars on Stevie" reached #6, making it their fourth Top 10 hit within the space of twelve months.

The "Stars on Stevie" medley was re-issued in 1991 under the title "Stars on Stevie Megamix" on the German Arcade label to promote The Very Best of Stars on 45 and has since appeared on a number of other greatest hits compilations with the group; the only difference between these two versions however is the sound of a live audience that has been overdubbed throughout the "Megamix", in all other respects they are in fact identical.

Track listing 7" single
Side A

"Stars on Stevie" (7" Mix) - 5:19All tracks written by Stevie Wonder unless otherwise noted "Uptight (Everything's Alright)" (Moy, Cosby, Wonder)
 "My Chérie Amour"
 "Yester-Me, Yester-You, Yesterday" (Miller, Wells)
 "Master Blaster (Jammin)"
 "You Are the Sunshine of My Life"
 "Isn't She Lovely"
 "Stars On" Jingle (Eggermont, Duiser)
 "Sir Duke"
 "I Wish"
 "I Was Made to Love Her" (Wonder, Hardaway, Moy, Cosby)
 "For Once in My Life" (Miller, Murden)
 "Superstition"
 "Fingertips" (Paul, Cosby)

Side B

"It's Not A Wonder, It's A Miracle" (7" Mix) (Eggermont, Duiser) - 3:09

Track listing 12" single
Side A

"Stars on Stevie" (12" Mix = album version) - 7:42All tracks written by Stevie Wonder unless otherwise noted''
 "Uptight (Everything's Alright)" (Moy, Cosby, Wonder)
 "My Chérie Amour"
 "Yester-Me, Yester-You, Yesterday" (Miller, Wells)
 "Master Blaster (Jammin)"
 "You Are the Sunshine of My Life"
 "Isn't She Lovely"
 "Stars On" Jingle (Eggermont, Duiser)
 "Sir Duke"
 "I Wish"
 "I Was Made to Love Her" (Wonder, Hardaway, Moy, Cosby)
 "For Once in My Life" (Miller, Murden)
 "Superstition"
 "Sir Duke"
 "Don't You Worry 'bout a Thing"
 "A Place in the Sun" (Miller, Wells)
 "Fingertips" (Paul, Cosby)

Side B

"It's Not A Wonder, It's A Miracle" (12" Mix) (Eggermont, Duiser) - 7:11

Chart history

Weekly charts

Year-end charts

Sources and external links
 
 
 Rateyourmusic.com biography and discography
 The Dutch Stars on 45 fansite
 Dutch Top 40
 UK Top 40
 Irish Charts.ie

References

Songs about musicians
1982 singles
Stars on 45 songs
CNR Music singles
CBS Records singles
Music medleys